is a city located in Gifu, Japan. , the city had an estimated population of 102,143, and a population density of 1200 persons per km2, in 42,233 households.

Geography
Kani is located in the south-central Gifu Prefecture, about 30 km from either Gifu city or Nagoya city, in the Kani basin. The Kiso River flows in the northern part of the city and roughly flat terrain continues to the Ota Basin on the opposite bank. The eastern portion of the city is hilly,  and has many golf courses (golf courses occupy nearly 10% of the city area).

Climate
The city has a climate characterized by characterized by hot and humid summers, and mild winters (Köppen climate classification Cfa).  The average annual temperature in Kani is 15.0 °C. The average annual rainfall is 1984 mm with September as the wettest month. The temperatures are highest on average in August, at around 27.6 °C, and lowest in January, at around 3.2 °C.

Neighbouring municipalities
Gifu Prefecture
Tajimi
Minokamo
Toki
Yaotsu
Sakahogi
Mitake
Aichi Prefecture
Inuyama

Demographics
Per Japanese census data, the population of Kani has recently plateaued after a period of rapid growth.

History
The area around Kani was part of traditional Mino Province.  During the Edo period, the area was divided between the holding of Owari Domain and tenryō territory under direct control of the Tokugawa shogunate. The Nakasendō highway connecting Edo and Kyoto passed through the area, with several post stations located in what is now Kani.  In the post-Meiji restoration cadastral reforms, Kani District in Gifu prefecture was created, and with the establishment of the modern municipalities system on July 1, 1889 the town of Imawatari was created. On February 1, 1955, Imawatari merged with the villages of Dota, Katabira, Harusato, Kukuri, Hiromaki and Hiromi to form the town of Kani.  On April 1, 1982 Kani was raised to city status.  On May 1, 2005, the town of Kaneyama (also from Kani District) was merged into Kani.

Government
Kani has a mayor-council form of government with a directly elected mayor and a unicameral city legislature of 22 members.

Economy
The population of Kani has increased rapidly over the past 40 years as a bedroom community for Gifu and Nagoya. Local industry is dominated by manufacturers of automobile parts.

Education
Kani has 11 public elementary schools and 5 public middle schools operated by the city government, and one private elementary and one private junior high school. The city has two public high schools operated by the Gifu Prefectural Board of Education and one private high school. Both Meijo University and the Gifu University of Medical Science have a campus in Kani.

The Sociedade Educacional Brazilian School (ソシエダーデ・エドカショナル・ブラジリアン・スクール) - Brazilian school is an international school located in Kani.

Transportation

Railway
 JR Central -  Taita Line
   -  
 Meitetsu Hiromi Line
 -  -  -   -

Highway

Sister city relations
 - Rota, Northern Marianas, since 1995
 - Redland City, Queensland, Australia, since November 2015

References

External links

 Kani City official website 

 
Cities in Gifu Prefecture